The Shankar Vihar metro station is a stop on the Magenta Line of the Delhi Metro. This represents part of the third phase of development of the Delhi Metro. It was opened to public on 29 May 2018. It is the only station in the Delhi Metro network where free movement of civilians is restricted, as it falls in the Delhi Cantonment area and "right in heart of defence zone".

Station layout

Structure
Shankar Vihar elevated metro station situated on the Magenta Line of Delhi Metro.

Station layout

Special provision for defence area
As the station lies completely inside an army unit, the commuters are required to carry ID cards to take exit from the station.

See also

Delhi
List of Delhi Metro stations
Transport in Delhi
Delhi Metro Rail Corporation
Delhi Suburban Railway
Delhi Monorail
Delhi Transport Corporation
South West Delhi
Shankar Vihar
National Capital Region (India)
List of rapid transit systems
List of metro systems

References

External links

 Delhi Metro Rail Corporation Ltd. (Official site)
 Delhi Metro Annual Reports
 
 UrbanRail.Net – descriptions of all metro systems in the world, each with a schematic map showing all stations.

Delhi Metro stations
Railway stations in India opened in 2018
Railway stations in New Delhi district